Auchterhouse railway station served the village of Auchterhouse in the Scottish county of Angus. Services were provided by the Dundee and Newtyle Railway. The first station of the name had to be moved in 1860 when the line was realigned to avoid an incline.

History
Opened by the Dundee and Newtyle Railway, and absorbed into the Caledonian Railway, it became part of the London, Midland and Scottish Railway during the Grouping of 1923. Passing on to the Scottish Region of British Railways on nationalisation in 1948 who closed it in 1955.

References

Sources 
 
 
 
 Auchterhouse station on navigable O. S. map
 Disused stations

External links
 RAILSCOT on Dundee and Newtyle Railway

Disused railway stations in Angus, Scotland
Former Caledonian Railway stations
Railway stations in Great Britain opened in 1831
Railway stations in Great Britain closed in 1955
1831 establishments in Scotland
1955 disestablishments in Scotland